The debt brake is a fiscal rule that was enacted in 2009 in Germany. The law, which is in Article 109, paragraph 3 and Article 115 of the Basic Law, Germany's constitution, is designed to restrict structural budget deficits at the Federal level and limit the issuance of government debt.

History
The debt brake was enacted because the nation's debt-to-GDP ratio exceeded the 60% threshold fixed in the Maastricht Treaty, primarily a result of the heavy payments to reconstruct former communist Eastern Germany after reunification and a loss of tax revenue during the Great Recession. The law required a change to the constitution and in 2009, it was approved with a two-thirds majority both by the Bundestag and the Bundesrat. At the federal level, the law limited the budget deficit to 0.35% of the GDP beginning in 2016 and German states that approved the law were prohibited from taking on debt after 2020. Three states, Berlin, Mecklenburg-Vorpommern and Schleswig-Holstein, did not establish the law in their constitutions. In the years prior to the Covid pandemic, the law helped reduce Germany's debt to 59.5% of GDP.  The debt brake is not absolute and allows the country to exceed the borrowing limits during a national emergency or a recession.

The debt brake was suspended in 2020 in order for the country to deal with the costs of the COVID-19 pandemic in Germany and is expected to come back into force in 2023.

In 2022, the government, led by Chancellor Olaf Scholz, succeeded in obtaining the two-thirds majority necessary to amend the debt brake to allow Germany to establish a 100 billion euro defense fund that would not be subject to the restrictions.  The change was spurred by the 2022 Russian invasion of Ukraine.

Although the mechanism was successful in its stated goal, reducing government borrowing, it was criticized by left-of-center parties including the Social Democrats and the Greens, which suggested that the law limited necessary government investment.  During the 2021 German federal election campaign, the Greens proposed reforming the rule to allow spending on infrastructure, healthcare and education.

See also
 Debt-to-GDP ratio
 Structural and cyclical deficit
 Government budget balance

References

Fiscal policy
Government debt
Public finance of Germany